The Puerto Rico women's national basketball team is governed by the Puerto Rican Basketball Federation.

Tournament record

Olympic Games

World Championship

Record against other teams at the World Cup

FIBA Americas Championship
 1993 – 6th place
 1995 – 3rd place
 1997 – 7th place
 1999 – 7th place
 2005 – 5th place
 2009 – 5th place
 2011 – 5th place
 2013 – 4th place
 2015 – 6th place
 2017 – 3rd place
 2019 – 4th place
 2021 – 2nd place

Pan American Games

Central American and Caribbean Games

Current roster
Roster for the 2022 FIBA Women's Basketball World Cup.

References

External links

FIBA profile
Puerto Rico at FIBA Americas

 
Women's national basketball teams
 
national